Gallerani is a surname. Notable people with the surname include:

Andrea Gallerani (died 1251), Italian Roman Catholic soldier
Cecilia Gallerani (1473–1536), Italian artist's model

See also
Galleani
Palazzo Venturi Gallerani, an 18th-century palace